Cuarto (Barrio Cuarto) is one of the 31 barrios of the municipality of Ponce, Puerto Rico.  Together with Primero, Segundo, Tercero, Quinto, and Sexto, Cuarto is one of the municipality's six core urban barrios. It was created in 1878.

Location
Cuarto is an urban barrio located in the southern section of the municipality, within the Ponce city limits, and southeast of the traditional center of the city, Plaza Las Delicias.

Boundaries

It is bounded on the North by Comercio/Francisco Parra Duperón Street, on the South by Ramón Power Street, on the West by Eugenio Maria de Hostos Avenue and Marina Streets, and on the East by Rio Portugues.  In terms of barrio-to-barrio boundaries, Cuarto is bounded in the North by Barrio Tercero, in the South by Canas Urbano, in the West by Primero, and in the East by San Antón.

Features and demographics
Cuarto has  of land area and no water area.  In 2000, the population of Cuarto was 3,011. The population density in Cuarto was 18,303 persons per square mile.

In 2010, the population of Cuarto was 1,999 persons, and it had a density of 12493.8 persons per square mile.

The communities of Belgica and El Bosque are found in Barrio Cuarto as are several other smaller communities.

Landmarks
Cuarto is home to Parque de la Abolicion on its southwestern edge. The NRHP-listed Casa Paoli, Old Ponce Casino, Ponce Massacre Museum, and Iglesia de la Santísima Trinidad are all located in Barrio Cuarto. The Puerto Rico Islamic Center at Ponce (see side photo) is also located in Barrio Cuarto.

Notable people from Barrio Cuarto
 Domingo Marrero Navarro, educator, writer, and speaker from the Belgica sector of Barrio Cuarto. 
 Ruth Fernández, internationally known contralto singer from the Belgica sector of Barrio Cuarto.

Gallery

See also

 List of communities in Puerto Rico

References

External links

 A 1911 picture of Calle Comercio, Barrio Cuarto's northern boundary (Barrio Cuarto is the right side of the street), looking east from Calle Marina at Plaza Degetau. Accessed 14 July 2020.

Barrio Cuarto
1878 establishments in Puerto Rico